Antakarinya (also Andagarinya, Antikirinya, Antikirrinya) is an Australian Aboriginal language. It is one of the Wati languages of the large Pama–Nyungan family.

The Antakarinya people were greatly affected by the atomic testing at Maralinga in the 1950s and the language was similarly affected in an attempt to explain the tests.

References

Wati languages
Critically endangered languages
Endangered indigenous Australian languages in South Australia